Zachery Xavier Peacock II (born October 13, 1987) is an American basketball player who last played for Fos Provence Basket of the LNB Pro A. He played college basketball for Georgia Tech, before starting a professional career in 2010. In his career he played for several teams in Germany and France.

College career
He played four seasons with the  Georgia Tech Yellow Jackets, where he averaged 8.3 points and 3.9 rebounds per game.

Professional career
After going undrafted in the 2010 NBA draft, Peacock signed with the Gießen 46ers of the German Basketball Bundesliga (BBL) on August 2. In his rookie season, he averaged 13.7 points and 6.4 rebounds per game. For the following 2011–12 season, he transferred to other BBL team Eisbären Bremerhaven, where he averaged 11.8 points and 5.4 rebounds per game. In October 2012, Peacock signed with his third BBL club Fraport Skyliners, where averaged 15.4 points and 5.2 rebound per game.

In the 2013–14 season, Peacock played in the French second-tier Pro B, with SOMB. He averaged 20.0 points and 8.0 rebounds per game with SOMB. He won the Foreign MVP award in his debut season and helped the team advance to Pro A. In June 2014, he signed with Cholet Basket of the first tier Pro A. However, in February 2015 he was released from the team after being suspended following a discussion with his teammat]. Peacock then signed with Turkish side Melikşah Üniversitesi S.K. of the Turkish second-tier TBL the following week. Peacock finished the season averaging 15.6 points and 8.9 rebounds per game.

In June 2015, Peacock returned to France by signing with JL Bourg Basket of the Pro B to a two-year deal. A year later, he achieved promotion to the Pro A with the club. In the 2016–17 season, Peacock was named the LNB Pro B MVP while leading his team to the championship and promotion. In May 2018, Peacock won the Pro A Most Valuable Player Award after leading the league in points, 19.3 per game, and evaluation rating, 20.3 per game.

On July 24, 2021, Peacock signed with Le Mans. On August 25, 2021, his club announced, after three successive postponements of his arrival in France, they could only note the absence of the player and terminated his contract.

On December 21, 2021, he has signed with Fos Provence Basket of the LNB Pro A.

References

External links
RealGM Profile
Georgia Tech Yellow Jackets bio

1987 births
Living people
Miami Norland Senior High School alumni
American expatriate basketball people in France
American expatriate basketball people in Germany
American expatriate basketball people in Turkey
American men's basketball players
Basketball players from Miami
Centers (basketball)
Cholet Basket players
Eisbären Bremerhaven players
Fos Provence Basket players
Giessen 46ers players
JL Bourg-en-Bresse players
Power forwards (basketball)
Skyliners Frankfurt players
SOMB Boulogne-sur-Mer players